La Honda Creek is a  long stream on the Pacific slope of the Santa Cruz Mountains and is a tributary of San Gregorio Creek. From its source near Bear Gulch Road and Skyline Boulevard (CA 35) in San Mateo County, California, La Honda Creek's water flow south to its confluence with Alpine Creek to form San Gregorio Creek in La Honda, and thence to the Pacific Ocean.

History

The Spanish historic name for La Honda Creek was Arroyo Hondo, meaning "deep stream". The creek was listed as Arroyo Ondo on several diseños on the Mexican land grants and as Arroyo Hondo on the 1856 Rancho Cañada de Raymundo map.

Watershed and Course
The La Honda Creek watershed drains .  A large part of the creek's upper watershed is in La Honda Creek Open Space Preserve.

California State Route 84 (CA 84) follows the valley of the creek from Sky Londa to San Gregorio.

Four named tributaries, Woodhams, Langley, Woodruff and Weeks Creeks, flow into La Honda Creek.

Ecology
The La Honda Creek watershed has been documented as historically supporting a salmonid population, including steelhead trout (Oncorhynchus mykiss) and potentially coho salmon (Oncorhynchus kisutch), however sediment eroding into the creek coupled with natural logjams present barriers to fish passage.

See also
List of watercourses in the San Francisco Bay Area

References

External links
 La Honda Creek Open Space Preserve website and trail map

Rivers of San Mateo County, California
Santa Cruz Mountains
Rivers of Northern California